The Scanlan SG-1A is an American, single seat, pod-and-boom, high-wing, strut-braced glider that was designed by Thomas W. Scanlan in 1970 and sold in the form of plans for amateur construction.

Design and development
The SG-1 was conceived as a very simple and economical aircraft that could be built with modest construction skills and very little financial investment. The prototype was completed in 1970 for US$400 and subsequent aircraft were built for under US$1000.

The SG-1 is constructed with a welded steel fuselage and tail surfaces and covered with doped aircraft fabric. The wing is made from an aluminium structure, covered in aluminum sheet and features upper-surface spoilers and a modified Gö 549 airfoil. The landing gear is a monowheel with the forward fuselage protected by a skid. The airframe was static tested to 9g without failing.

Operational history
In April 2011 there was one SG-1 and one SG-1A on the Federal Aviation Administration registry.

Variants
SG-1
Prototype design, with V-struts and a constant-chord wing. One built.
SG-1A
 Improved model, with double-tapered wings and single wing struts. About four built.

Aircraft on display
US Southwest Soaring Museum

Specifications (SG-1A)

See also

References

1970s United States sailplanes
Homebuilt aircraft
Aircraft first flown in 1970